Mohamed Ouattara (born 28 June 1999) is an Ivorian professional footballer who plays as a defender for Tanzanian club Simba S.C.

References

External links
 
 

1999 births
Living people
Association football defenders
Ivorian footballers
Ivorian expatriate footballers
Wydad AC players
Expatriate footballers in Morocco
Al-Hilal Club (Omdurman) players
Expatriate footballers in Sudan
Ivorian expatriate sportspeople in Morocco
Ivorian expatriate sportspeople in Sudan
Sudan Premier League players
Renaissance Club Athletic Zemamra players